KPRC may refer to:

 KPRC-TV, a television station (PSIP 2/RF 35) licensed to Houston, Texas, United States
 KPRC (AM), a radio station (950 AM) licensed to Houston, Texas, United States
 KPRC-FM, a radio station (100.7 FM) licensed to Salinas, California, United States
 KODA, a radio station (99.1 FM) licensed to Houston, Texas, United States; formerly KPRC-FM from 1946 to 1958
 The ICAO code for Prescott Municipal Airport in Prescott, Arizona, United States